Maxine Miller (born June 18, 1928) is a Canadian actress who appeared in the first three seasons of Mister Rogers' Neighborhood. In the 1980s, she voiced True Heart Bear in The Care Bears Movie II: A New Generation (1986) and appeared on the animated series My Pet Monster.

More recently, she guest starred in Showtime's The Chris Isaak Show and Dead Like Me, and had a role in CinéGroupe's Lion of Oz in 2000.

In 2010, she played the Wallace's neighbor Ms. Lesley McKane in the Christmas movie Battle of the Bulbs.

Filmography

Film

Television

External links

Screenshot of Miller's character from a Dead Like Me episode

Canadian film actresses
Canadian television actresses
Canadian voice actresses
Living people

1928 births